Kim Min-ju (born February 5, 2001) is a South Korean singer and actress under Management SOOP. She is best known as a former member of South Korean-Japanese girl group Iz*One after finishing 11th in Mnet's girl group survival show Produce 48, representing Urban Works. 

Following the group's disbandment, she and Urban Works announced her intentions to pursue her acting career. Since June 2020, she has been hosting music program Show! Music Core. She departed Urban Works in 2022, where she signed with Management SOOP afterwards.

Life and career

Early life and career beginnings
Kim was born on February 5, 2001. She has a younger sister and an older brother. She attended School of Performing Arts Seoul and graduated in February 2020. Prior to joining the reality girl group survival show Produce 48, she had appeared as an actress in music videos and Korean dramas, notably the 2018 MBC television series Tempted, wherein she portrayed the role of the young Choi Su-ji (Moon Ga-young).

2018–present: Produce 48, Iz*One, solo activities

From June to August 2018, Kim represented Urban Works on Produce 48. On the finale episode, she eventually placed eleventh and thus joined the show's final debut lineup, Iz*One. On October 29, 2018, she officially debuted as a member of the group with the release of their first extended play (EP) Color*Iz.

In 2019, Kim starred in the film The Fault Is Not Yours, which was premiered in May at 20th Jeonju International Film Festival. It was recorded prior to her appearing in Produce 48.

In June 2020, Kim, as Kang Mi-na's successor, joined Kang Chan-hee and Stray Kids' Hyunjin as co-hosts of the South Korean music program Show! Music Core.

After Iz*One's disbandment on April 29, 2021, Kim returned to Urban Works. On October 7, her company officially announced that she will promote as an actress.

On September 1, 2022, Kim departed Urban Works and signed a contract with Management SOOP.

In 2022, Kim starred in the historical drama The Forbidden Marriage, an adaptation of the same webtoon, for which Kim received the Best New Actress Award at the 2022 MBC Drama Awards.

Discography

Singles

Soundtrack appearance

Guest appearance

Songwriting credits

Filmography

Film

Television series

Web series

Television shows

Web shows

Music videos appearances

Bibliography

Solo photobooks

Awards and nominations

Notes

References

External links

2001 births
Living people
K-pop singers
South Korean female idols
South Korean women pop singers
South Korean dance musicians
South Korean film actresses
South Korean web series actresses
21st-century South Korean women singers
21st-century South Korean actresses
Produce 48 contestants
Iz*One members
Singers from Seoul
Swing Entertainment artists
Actresses from Seoul
School of Performing Arts Seoul alumni
Reality show winners
Japanese-language singers of South Korea